The Ancient Lakes of the Columbia Valley AVA (referred to locally as the Ancient Lakes AVA) is an American Viticulture Area which lies on the western edge of the Columbia Basin near the town of Quincy in Washington state.  The wine region is entirely included within the larger Columbia Valley AVA.  Ancient Lakes of the Columbia Valley became the 13th AVA in Washington State on October 18, 2012.

Geography 

Lying between the Beezley Hills to the North and the Frenchman Hills to the south, the growing region was severely impacted by the immense water flows of the Missoula floods. The scouring effect of the waters stripped the top soils down to the basalt and scoured out canyons referred to locally as "coulees" which are prominent features near many of the planted vineyards.  The Columbia River forms the western border of the grape growing region.

Soils 
Basalt and caliche rock are unique in their prominence of the soils in the grape growing areas.  Missoula floods scoured the area stripping the original top soils along the western edge of the Quincy valley.  Large standing pools of water left by the floods created thick deposits of caliche that lay over the basalt.  With time, both rock types have fractured and are prominent in the soils.  Quincy loam and windblown loess soils lay over the rocks.

Climate 
The growing region lies close to the easternmost foothills of the Cascade Mountain range.  A strong rain shadow effect gives the area one of the lowest precipitation rates in the Columbia Valley.

Grape growing 
Deep in the heart of Washington Wine country, white wine grapes represent the bulk of the grape plantings in the growing region and are planted on the higher elevations (avg. 1200–1500') along the Beezley Hills and the Evergreen and Babcock ridges.

White Riesling, Chardonnay, and Pinot Gris are dominant plantings along with red varieties used for rosé-style wines

Red wine varieties are planted in close proximity to the Columbia River along the benches and exposed basalt cliffs formed by the "cataract effects" of the Missoula floods. This area lies at a lower elevation and is considerably warmer, lending itself to red wine grape production including Syrah, Merlot and others.

Vineyards 
Cave B- Familigia Vineyards
Jones of Washington
Evergreen Vineyards
Ryan Patrick Vineyards
Spanish Castle Vineyards
White Heron Cellars

References 

American Viticultural Areas
Washington (state) wine
Grant County, Washington
2012 establishments in Washington (state)